Derbyshire County Cricket Club in 1934 was the cricket season when the English club Derbyshire had been playing for sixty-three years. It was their thirty-sixth season in the County Championship and they won ten matches in the County Championship, to finish third.

1934 season
 
Derbyshire played 28 matches in Championship, and one against the touring Australians. They won eleven matches altogether, ten in the County Championship to finish third in the table, on course to win the championship two years later in 1936.  A W Richardson was in his fourth season as captain.  Denis Smith scored most runs and Tommy Mitchell took most wickets.

Two players made their debut during the season. Elijah Carrington had been brought into the club in the previous year and played first team matches for three more years. Arnold Townsend played one game in 1934, but went on to become a significant player for the club.

Matches

{| class="wikitable" style="width:100%;"
|-
! style="background:#efefef;" colspan="6"| List of matches
|- style="background:#efefef;"
!No.
!Date
!V
!Result 
!Margin
!Notes
|- 
|1
 |5 May 1934
| Lancashire  Rutland Recreation Ground, Ilkeston  
| style="background:#fc0;"|Drawn
|
| Watson 128; Iddon 121; Sibbles 6–44 
|- 
|2
|12 May 1934
|  Sussex   County Ground, Hove 
| style="background:#f00;"|Lost
| 2 wickets
|  
|- 
|3
| 19 May 1934
| Warwickshire  County Ground, Derby 
| style="background:#0f0;"|Won
| 2 wickets
|  
|- 
|4
|23 May 1934
| Northamptonshire  County Ground, Northampton 
| style="background:#0f0;"|Won
| Innings and 147 runs
| T S Worthington 147 
|- 
|5
|26 May 1934
| Yorkshire Queen's Park, Chesterfield 
| style="background:#f00;"|Lost
| 102 runs
| T. B. Mitchell 5–26 and 6–96; Bowes 5–60 
|- 
|6
|2 Jun 1934
| Nottinghamshire  Trent Bridge, Nottingham 
| style="background:#0f0;"|Won
| 28 runs
| T R Armstrong 5–72; Voce 7–53; L F Townsend 7–47 
|- 
|7
|6 Jun 1934
|  Surrey Kennington Oval 
| style="background:#f00;"|Lost
| 7 wickets
| Gregory 124; D Smith 126; Gover 6–37; T S Worthington 6–90 
|- 
|8
|9 Jun 1934
| Hampshire United Services Recreation Ground, Portsmouth 
| style="background:#f00;"|Lost
| Innings and 82 runs
| Arnold 144; Mead 138; A E Alderman 124 
|- 
|9
|13 Jun 1934
|  Gloucestershire  County Ground, Derby 
| style="background:#fc0;"|Drawn
|
| Hammond 134; T. B. Mitchell 5–119; 
|- 
|10
|16 Jun 1934
| Leicestershire Aylestone Road, Leicester 
| style="background:#0f0;"|Won
| 124 runs
| T. B. Mitchell 7–55 
|- 
|11
|20 Jun 1934
| Kent Queen's Park, Chesterfield 
| style="background:#fc0;"|Drawn
|
| Freeman 6–105; T. B. Mitchell 5–114 
|- 
|12
|23 Jun 1934
| Northamptonshire  County Ground, Derby 
| style="background:#fc0;"|Drawn
|
| A E Alderman 115; Timms 100; T. B. Mitchell 6–73 
|- 
|13
|27 Jun 1934
|  Sussex   Park Road Ground, Buxton 
| style="background:#fc0;"|Drawn
|
| Parks 138; D Smith 120 
|- 
|14
|30 Jun 1934
| Somerset  Queen's Park, Chesterfield 
| style="background:#0f0;"|Won
| 10 wickets
| H Storer 113 
|- 
|15
|4 Jul 1934
| Kent  Nevill Ground, Tunbridge Wells  
| style="background:#0f0;"|Won
| 4 wickets
| W H Copson 5–36; Freeman 5–29 
|- 
|16
|7 Jul 1934
|  Worcestershire Amblecote, Stourbridge 
| style="background:#0f0;"|Won
| Inings and 115 runs
| T. B. Mitchell 8–22 and 5–66; L F Townsend 5–48 
|- 
|17
|11 Jul 1934
| Australian cricket team in England in 1934  Queen's Park, Chesterfield 
| style="background:#f00;"|Lost
| 9 wickets
| Ebeling 5–28; T. B. Mitchell 7–105; Fleetwood-Smith 5–38 
|- 
|18
|14 Jul 1934
| Middlesex   County Ground, Derby 
| style="background:#0f0;"|Won
| 278 runs
| T. B. Mitchell 6–56 and 7–57 
|- 
|19
|18 Jul 1934
|  Gloucestershire  Wagon Works Ground, Gloucester 
| style="background:#fc0;"|Drawn
|
| Dacre 117; D Smith 131; A F Skinner 102; Goddard 5–90; Sinfield 5–54 
|- 
|20
|21 Jul 1934
|  WorcestershireQueen's Park, Chesterfield 
| style="background:#fc0;"|Drawn
|
| Gibbons 105 
|- 
|21
|25 Jul 1934
|  Surrey Rutland Recreation Ground, Ilkeston 
| style="background:#fc0;"|Drawn
|
| D Smith 125 
|- 
|22
|28 Jul 1934
| Hampshire County Ground, Derby 
| style="background:#0f0;"|Won
| 10 wickets
| T S Worthington 154; T. B. Mitchell 6–90 
|- 
|23
|1 Aug 1934
| Yorkshire Bramall Lane, Sheffield 
| style="background:#fc0;"|Drawn
|
| T. B. Mitchell 5–81 
|- 
|24
|4 Aug 1934
| Warwickshire Edgbaston, Birmingham 
| style="background:#fc0;"|Drawn
|
| Paine 6–88 
|- 
|25
|8 Aug 1934
| Lancashire  Old Trafford, Manchester 
| style="background:#f00;"|Lost
| 135 runs
| Hopwood 5–32 and 8–58 
|- 
|26
|11 Aug 1934
| Somerset Clarence Park, Weston-super-Mare 
| style="background:#0f0;"|Won
| Innings and 69 runs
| L F Townsend 106 and 6–66 and 5–64 
|- 
|27
|15 Aug 1934
| Middlesex    Lord's Cricket Ground, St John's Wood 
| style="background:#f00;"|Lost
| 84 runs
| C Smith 5–51; W H Copson 5–63; SIms 6–85 
|- 
|28
|18 Aug 1934
| Nottinghamshire  Rutland Recreation Ground, Ilkeston 
| style="background:#0f0;"|Won
| 201 runs
| A V Pope 6–21; Voce 6–52; W H Copson 5–40 
|- 
|29
|29 Aug 1934
| Leicestershire Queen's Park, Chesterfield 
| style="background:#0f0;"|Won
| 42 runs
|  
|- 
|

Statistics

County Championship batting averages

County Championship bowling averages

Wicket-keeper

Harry Elliott Catches 58, Stumping 18

See also
Derbyshire County Cricket Club seasons
1934 English cricket season

References

1934 in English cricket
Derbyshire County Cricket Club seasons
English cricket seasons in the 20th century